The R202 road is a regional road in Ireland linking Dromod in County Leitrim to Swanlinbar in County Cavan. En route it passes through Mohill and Ballinamore.

Connections

The R202 road links with the N87 in Swanlinbar and then runs to the border of Northern Ireland becoming the A32 that runs into Enniskillen. At the other end it links with the N4 in Dromod. There are also connections in Dromod with the Dublin-Sligo railway line two-hourly frequency train service to Sligo from Dublin Connolly.

See also
Roads in Ireland
National primary road
National secondary road

References
Roads Act 1993 (Classification of Regional Roads) Order 2006 – Department of Transport

Regional roads in the Republic of Ireland
Roads in County Leitrim
Roads in County Cavan